Kristi Marku (born 13 April 1995 in Durrës) is an Albanian football player who plays for Gloria Buzău.

International career

Under-21
He received his first Albania under-21 call up by Skënder Gega in September 2014 for a friendly against Romania on 8 October, where he was an unused substitute in the 3–1 loss. He was called up in March for Albania's opening 2017 European Under-21 Championship qualifier against Liechtenstein on 28 March 2015.

Club statistics

Club

References

External links

1995 births
Living people
Footballers from Durrës
Albanian footballers
Albania youth international footballers
Albania under-21 international footballers
Association football defenders
KF Teuta Durrës players
FC Rosengård 1917 players
Budapest Honvéd FC players
Flamurtari Vlorë players
FK Partizani Tirana players
KS Lushnja players
KF Ferizaj players
FC Pyunik players
FK Kukësi players
FC Gloria Buzău players
Liga II players
Kategoria Superiore players
Nemzeti Bajnokság I players
Football Superleague of Kosovo players
Armenian Premier League players
Albanian expatriate footballers
Expatriate footballers in Sweden
Expatriate footballers in Hungary
Expatriate footballers in Kosovo
Expatriate footballers in Armenia
Albanian expatriate sportspeople in Sweden
Albanian expatriate sportspeople in Hungary
Albanian expatriate sportspeople in Kosovo
Albanian expatriate sportspeople in Armenia